Arnulf III may refer to:

 Arnulf III, Count of Boulogne (died in 990)
 Arnulf III, Count of Flanders (c. 1055 – 1071)
 Arnulf III (Archbishop of Milan) (died in 1097)